

The Iversky Monastery was a monastery of the Ukrainian Orthodox Church (Moscow Patriarchate) in Donetsk, Ukraine. It was built between 1997 and 2001, and was closed in 2014 due to the war in Donbas. The monastery was largely destroyed  during the Second Battle of Donetsk Airport in January 2015.

History
The monastery was built on a vacant plot in northern Donetsk, close to the airport.

War in Donbas

The monastery was severely damaged during the war in Donbas. The sisters evacuated the monastery in 2014. In January 2015, the building was destroyed during the Second Battle of Donetsk Airport. The monastery and its cemetery were almost completely destroyed in the fighting, with only a bullet-ridden shell remaining.

Architecture
The monastery consisted of a church with a bell tower, a convent building housing the sisters and a number of other buildings. A cemetery, an orchard and a vegetable garden were located within the grounds of the monastery.

References

Buildings and structures in Donetsk
Monasteries of the Ukrainian Orthodox Church (Moscow Patriarchate)
Ukrainian Orthodox Church (Moscow Patriarchate) church buildings
Religious buildings and structures completed in 2001
Buildings and structures demolished in 2015
Ruins in Ukraine
Modern ruins
Ruined abbeys and monasteries